Christophe Jerretie (born 31 August 1979) is a French politician of the La République En Marche! (LREM) who was a member of the French National Assembly from 2017–2022, representing the department of Corrèze. From 2017–2020 he was a member of La République En Marche! (LREM).

Political career
Jerretie was mayor of Naves for three years before getting into parliament. In parliament, Jerretie served on the Finance Committee and the Committee on European Affairs. In addition to his committee assignments, he was a member of the French-Swedish Parliamentary Friendship Group. 

In July 2019, Jerretie challenged incumbent chairman Gilles Le Gendre for the leadership of the LREM parliamentary group; Le Gendre was subsequently re-elected in the first round, with Jerretie coming in sixth out of seven candidates. In 2020, Jerretie left the LREM group and instead joined the MoDem group.

Jerretie lost his seat in the first round of the 2022 French legislative election.

Political positions
In 2019, Jerretie was one of nine MPs from the LREM parliamentary group who voted against the party line and opposed the Comprehensive Economic and Trade Agreement (CETA) with Canada.

See also
 2017 French legislative election

References

1979 births
Living people
People from Tulle
Deputies of the 15th National Assembly of the French Fifth Republic
La République En Marche! politicians
University of Limoges alumni
Members of Parliament for Corrèze
21st-century French politicians